Tubberclare or Tubberclair is a village and townland in County Westmeath, Ireland, between Ballymahon and Athlone. Toberclare is the official spelling of the name in English. 

Tubberclair is also the name of the surrounding parish, which includes the villages of Glasson and Ballykeeran. It borders Lough Ree on the Westmeath side and is reputed to be the geographical centre of Ireland with a monument depicting this in the centre of the parish.

Name
While the first element refers to a well, the second element  may refer to a board. Alternatively, it could mean the well of the plain, as Tubberclare is a largely flat, fertile plain.

Amenities
It is home to a primary school, community centre, heritage centre, shops, pubs, restaurants and many small businesses including marinas.  It is also home to Tubberclair Gaelic football club which has provided several inter-county players over the years. It is also home to the Glasson Golf Hotel and Country Club, with a course designed by Christy O'Connor Jnr that borders Lough Ree. The centre of Ireland is believed to be the Pinnacle, in Rath, a region of Tubberclair.

See also
 List of towns and villages in Ireland

References

Geography of County Westmeath
Towns and villages in County Westmeath